Ozma is the second studio album by the Melvins, released in 1989 through Boner Records. It is the first Melvins album to feature Lori Black on bass guitar and was recorded when the band relocated to San Francisco.

Background and release
"Love Thing" is a cover of the KISS song "Love Theme from KISS" from their eponymous debut album. "Creepy Smell" begins with the intro to the song "Living In Sin" from Gene Simmons' solo album.  "Candy-O" is originally by The Cars and was a bonus track on the cassette and CD editions.

The title refers to the character Princess Ozma from the Oz series of books.

The CD version includes the entire Gluey Porch Treatments album. The track listing that is printed on the CD lists 34 tracks, but the CD only has 33 tracks. This is due to "Exact Paperbacks" and "Happy Grey or Black" being mistakenly combined on track 23 and not split into separate tracks as credited.

The album's cover art was drawn by Spazz bassist and owner of Slap-a-Ham Records, Chris Dodge.

Critical reception

Allmusic critic Ned Raggett wrote: "The genre-dipping and out-of-nowhere efforts of later years were still some distance off, to be sure, but moments like the vocal/drum-only part on "Oven" and the needle-thin feedback treatment punctuating "Revulsion/We Reach" (along with occasional chimes) show more chances already being taken." Ira Robbins of Trouser Press described the record as "an outpouring of overweight weirdness cut into short slices".

The album was included in Revolver magazine's list of "10 Grunge Albums You Need to Own", and was described as "a bestial metal-punk hybrid that's lumbering, ponderous, and completely frightening."

Track listing

Side one

Side two

CD/cassette bonus track

Personnel
Buzz – vocals, guitar
Lori – bass
Dale – drums, backing vocals

Additional personnel
Mark Deutrom – producer
Joshua Roberts – engineer
Chris Dodge – cover art

References

External links

1989 albums
Melvins albums
Boner Records albums
Grunge albums
Sludge metal albums